Heather Ross Miller (born 1939) is an American writer.

Miller was born in Albemarle, North Carolina. In 1961, she earned a bachelor's degree from Woman's College (now The University of North Carolina at Greensboro). She went on to earn an MFA in creative writing from the college in 1969. For the 1968–69 and 1973–74 years, she earned fellowships from the National Endowment for the Arts. Inspired by professor and poet Randall Jarrell, Miller became an instructor in reading and writing.

Books
The Edge of the Woods (1964)
Tenants of the House (1966)
The Wind Southerly (1967)
Gone a Hundred Miles (1968)
Horse Horse Tyger Tyger (1973)
A Spiritual Divorce and Other Stories (1974)
Confessions of a Champeen Fire-Baton Twirler (1976)
Therapia (1982)
Adam's First Wife (1983)
Hard Evidence (1990)
La Jupe Espagnole (1991)
Friends and Assassins (1993)
In the Funny Papers (1995)
Days of Love and Murder (1999)
Champeen (1999)
Crusoe's Island: A Story of a Writer and a Place (2000)
Miss Jessie Dukes and Kid Heavy (2003)
Freaks in Love (2004)
Gypsy with Baby (2005)
The Creative Writing Murders (2007) 
Lumina (2011)
Celestial Navigator (2014)

References

External links
Finding Aid for the Heather Ross Miller Papers at The University of North Carolina at Greensboro

1939 births
Living people
American women writers
People from Albemarle, North Carolina
21st-century American women